Mike Arthur (born May 7, 1968) is an American former professional football player who was a center in the National Football League (NFL).

Biography
Arthur was born Michael Scott Arthur on May 7, 1968 in Minneapolis, Minnesota. Arthur grew up in Houston, Texas, and played football at Spring Woods High School.

Career
Arthur was drafted in the 5th round of the 1991 NFL Draft by the Cincinnati Bengals and spent his first two seasons with the team. The next two seasons he spent with the New England Patriots. His final two seasons were played with the Green Bay Packers, including a victory in Super Bowl XXXI.

He played at the collegiate level at Texas A&M University.

See also
List of New England Patriots players
List of Green Bay Packers players

References

Players of American football from Minneapolis
Cincinnati Bengals players
New England Patriots players
Green Bay Packers players
American football centers
Texas A&M University alumni
Texas A&M Aggies football players
1968 births
Living people